KVWE (102.9 FM) is a radio station broadcasting a sports format. Licensed to Amarillo, Texas, United States, it serves the Amarillo area. The station is owned by Alpha Media.  Its studios are located on Olsen Boulevard near Western Avenue in southwest Amarillo, and its transmitter is located near Farm Road 1719 and Loop 335 in northwest Amarillo.

Originally KRGN-FM, it was sold by Family Life Radio to Midessa Broadcasting for $700,000. Then renamed to KEYU-FM, it was previously owned by Drewry Communications. On August 10, 2015, Raycom Media announced that it would purchase Drewry Communications for $160 million. The deal was completed on December 1, 2015. KEYU-FM, along with KTXC in Lamesa were Raycom's only radio stations since the company sold WMC AM-FM in Memphis, Tennessee to Infinity Broadcasting Corporation in 2000.

On May 16, 2019, Gray Television agreed to sell KEYU-FM to Alpha Media for $250,000. On July 11, 2019, Alpha flipped the station from Spanish adult hits (as "Mundo FM") to an English-language rhythmic CHR format as "WE 102.9", and changed the call letters to KVWE.

On August 11, 2022, Alpha announced they would flip KVWE to sports talk under the name "Panhandle Sports Star" on August 15, and affiliate with ESPN Radio.

References

External links

VWE (FM)
Alpha Media radio stations
Radio stations established in 1987
1987 establishments in Texas
Sports radio stations in the United States
ESPN Radio stations